WZIN (104.3 FM) is a commercial FM radio station licensed to Charlotte Amalie in the U.S. Virgin Islands. WZIN is simulcast with WERR (104.1 FM) in Vega Alta, Puerto Rico, both airing a Contemporary Christian format.  WZIN serves the U.S. Virgin Islands, the British Virgin Islands, and Puerto Rico.  The station is owned by WERR Radio Redentor, Inc.

Logos

References

External links
 Official website
 

1976 establishments in the United States Virgin Islands
Contemporary Christian radio stations in the United States
Radio stations established in 1976
ZIN
Charlotte Amalie, U.S. Virgin Islands